Bayendfoulgo is a village in the Zimtenga Department of Bam Province in northern-central Burkina Faso. As of 2005 it had a population of 929.

References

Populated places in the Centre-Nord Region
Bam Province